Hawaiian gold coral (Kulamanamana haumeaae) is a rare, extremely long-lived deep-sea coral found on seamounts near Hawaii. It is the only member of the monotypic genus Kulamanamana. One colony has been dated as 2,740 years old, while others are considered 5,000 years old. Although it has been harvested commercially for use in jewellery for a long time, it was not formally described by taxonomists until 2012 when it was found to be related to both the genus Savalia and the octocoral-associated zoanthid, Corallizoanthus tsukaharai.

In jewelry
Gold coral is prized in jewellery making for its iridescent qualities which are similar to tiger's eye.

The skeletons of such corals and the products made from them are highly valuable. However, unprocessed skeleton material is now rare as it is no longer commercially harvested in Hawaii. International trade therefore primarily consists of jewellery made from premoratorium stock, which may be decades old.

References
 Golden Spider Coral

Further reading

Parazoanthidae
Cnidarians of Hawaii
Endemic fauna of Hawaii
Animals described in 2013